John Vredenburgh Van Pelt, F.A.I.A., A.D.G.F., (February 24, 1874 – 1962) was an architectural historian, author, and American architect active in early to mid-twentieth-century New York City. He was a partner in Green & Van Pelt (1906), in  Thompson & Van Pelt (1925), and Van Pelt, Hardy & Goubert (1928–1930). He had his offices in New York City and Patchogue, Long Island.

Biography
Van Pelt was born in New Orleans and attended private schools there until attending the Ecole des Arts Decoratifs and the Ecole des Beaux Arts in Paris. In 1904, he worked for Carrère and Hastings.

His offices were on 45 West 45th Street, New York City (sharing office space with the architectural firm of Weiskopf & Pickworth), and Roe Boulevard, West, Patchogue, Long Island, New York.

During World War I, he was chairman of inspection committees and later in charge of computing the budget. He was a member and fellow of the American Institute of Architects and chairman of the Public Information Committee, a member of the Societe des Architectes Diplomes, Paris, member of the Beaux Arts Society of New York, and for several years secretary of the Finer Arts Federation, and Patchogue Chamber of Commerce.

Works

 St. John the Evangelist Parish School SWC of First Avenue and 56th Street, a four-story brick and stone school, with fellow architect Franklin A. Green, NYC (1907)
 Patchogue Village Library Building, Patchogue, New York (1908)
 Our Lady of Victory Church (Bronx, New York) (1911) 
 Nippon Club, at 161 West 93rd Street, NYC (1912)
 plinth, Joan of Arc Monument on Riverside Drive, 93rd Street, Upper West Side, New York City (Anna Hyatt Huntington, sculptor) (1915) 
 Church, School and Rectory of Church of St. John Nepomucene, NYC, built for $300,000 (1925) 
 The Gennadius Library and Residences for the American School of Classical Studies at Athens, built for $375,000 in Greece (but if in America would have cost $1,150,000 with marble carving being done by refugees from Smyrna) (1926) 
 United States Post Office (Patchogue, New York) (1930)
 Church of the Guardian Angel (New York City) (1930), 10th Avenue at 21st Street.
 Residence of Newton Fassett, in Elmira, New York, built for $45,000
 Residence of George E. Hardy, Fishers Island, built for $150,000.
 school, Our Lady of Mercy, Webster Avenue, Bronx, New York, built for $200,000
 Our Lady of the Rosary Church (Yonkers, New York)
 St. Ambrose Church (Manhattan)

Published writings
John V. Van Pelt. The Essentials of Composition as Applied to Art. New York: The Macmillan Company, 1913.
John Vredenburgh Van Pelt I(preface and introduction). Architecture Toscane-the Library of Architectural Documents, Volume 1-Palais, Maisons Et Autres Edifices De La Toscane, Volume 2-D'Espouy-Fragments D'Architecture Antique. New York: Pencil Points Press, 1923.

John V. Van Pelt. Masterpieces of Spanish Architecture. New York: Pencil Points Press, 1925.

References

1874 births
1962 deaths
American people of Dutch descent
Architects from New York City
People from Patchogue, New York
Architects from New Orleans
Companies based in Manhattan
Defunct architecture firms based in New York City
American ecclesiastical architects
Architects of Roman Catholic churches
Fellows of the American Institute of Architects
Beaux Arts architects